Fraus minima is a moth of the family Hepialidae. It is endemic to New South Wales, South Australia, Tasmania and Victoria.

References

Moths described in 1989
Hepialidae